Oruawharo Homestead is an historic homestead built in 1879 in Takapau, Central Hawke's Bay, New Zealand.  It was designed by Wellington architect Charles Tringham in the Italianate style and built from native timbers for Sydney and Sophia Johnston by Sydney's father, the politician and merchant John Johnston. Johnston senior of Wellington was the original purchaser of the run in the 1850s. Sydney Johnston had the nearby Takapau township surveyed in 1876.

Family members were patrons of Mother Suzanne Aubert and the homestead was given to the Catholic Church in 1965. It is currently run as a wedding venue.

On 7 April 1983, was building was registered by the New Zealand Historic Places Trust (now known as Heritage New Zealand) as a Category I heritage structure, with registration number 1048.

The building has 21 rooms and uses rimu for many of its timber fittings.

Railway station 
Oruawharo had a railway station from about 1882 to 1896. In 1874 Edmund Allan and Samuel Kingstreet won a £14,100 contract for the  extension of the Napier to Waipukurau railway south to Takapau. It opened on 12 March 1877. Oruawharo seems to have first appeared in a timetable as a flag station in 1882. An application by Sydney Johnston for a private siding was mentioned on 19 March 1888. In 1896 and 1897 it was recorded as having a shelter shed and platform. It seems to have last appeared in a railway timetable in 1896.

In 1981, when the Silver Fern Farms slaughterhouse opened, a new passing loop at Oruawharo replaced that at Takapau. It is still in use.

References

Houses in New Zealand
1870s architecture in New Zealand
Buildings and structures in the Hawke's Bay Region
Heritage New Zealand Category 1 historic places in the Hawke's Bay Region
Central Hawke's Bay District
1879 establishments in New Zealand
Houses completed in 1879